Peacham is a town in the U.S. state of Vermont

Peacham may also refer to:
Henry Peacham (born 1546), was an English curate, best known for his treatise on rhetoric titled The Garden of Eloquence first published in 1577
Henry Peacham (born 1578), son of Henry Peacham (born 1546), was a poet and writer, known today primarily for his book, The Compleat Gentleman, first printed in 1622

See also
The Peacham drawing (the only surviving contemporary Shakespearean illustration)